Tonto is the fictional robot servant of the Castaka family since the time of Aghnar, and the narrator of their tale in the Metabarons comic book.

Expanded History
The Metabarons Universe Guide, a publication meant to help roleplayers get more into the Metabarons characters, gives some more insides on the personal history of Tonto. 
Once a defective robosurgeon (showing major flaws in his less-than-accondiscendent personality) was issued by Hospital Planet's production lines, and scheduled for dismantling. Othon met him while the little robosurgeon was treating Bari, his crippled son. Unable to wait for the surgery results, Othon forced Tonto into let him see his son, and the droid, displaying his unpredictable judgment, not only agreed, but swore eternal alliance to his new master's family, gaining his protection and his safety in the process.
He became the caretaker of the Metabunker, the gigantic flying fortress of the Metabarons (totally attuned to his mental orders), and carried out all Metabarons surgical needs (for example implanting robotic eyes into Dona Vincenta head after she tore out hers, and giving pediatric care to all babies born in the family). Albeit his major flaws makes him sanctimonious and always insofferent to discipline, Tonto gained the trust of all Metabarons, even gaining the title of "best and only friend" of Nameless, the last one.
When Nameless "reprogrammed" Steelhead, his villainous grandfather turned almost completely into a robot, into being Lothar, the mindwiped servant, Tonto took him as his personal assistant, each day telling him stories from the Metabaron's lore, both to please his ego and to quell his boredom.

Fictional robots